Phauda is a genus of moths of the Phaudidae family.

Species
Phauda arikana Matsumura, 1911
Phauda bicolor Fibiger, Larsen & Buchsbaum, 2010
Phauda defluiteri Roepke, 1943
Phauda dichroa Jordan, 1907
Phauda dimidiata Snellen, 1879
Phauda enigma Hering, 1925
Phauda eos de Joannis, 1910
Phauda erythra Jordan, 1907
Phauda flammans Walker, 1854
Phauda fortunii Herrich-Schäffer, 1854
Phauda fuscalis Swinhoe, 1892
Phauda horishana Matsumura, 1927
Phauda kantonensis Mell, 1922
Phauda lanceolata Jordan, 1907
Phauda limbata Wallengren, 1861
Phauda mahisa Moore, 1858
Phauda mimica Strand, 1915
Phauda pratti Leach, 1890
Phauda rubra Jordan, 1907
Phauda similis Hering, 1925
Phauda sumatrensis Walker, 1864
Phauda triadum Walker, 1854

References

Phaudinae
Zygaenoidea genera